Cycas hoabinhensis is a species of cycad endemic to central Vietnam, where it is found in Hoa Binh, Ha Nam, Ha Tay, and Ninh Binh provinces.

Conservation
Cycas hoabinhensis is protected in Cuc Phuong National Park in Ninh Binh province, Chua Huong Tich Nature Reserve in Ha Tay province, and Thuong Tien Nature Reserve in Hoa Binh province. It has been extensively collected from the wild for ornamental purposes in Hanoi.

References

hoabinhensis